The New York Islanders are an American ice hockey team based in Uniondale, New York. They compete in the National Hockey League (NHL) Eastern Conference's Metropolitan Division. Since their inaugural season in 1972, the team has played its home games in Nassau Veterans Memorial Coliseum, but moved to the Barclays Center in 2015. In forty-nine completed seasons, the team has won the Stanley Cup championship four times and has qualified for the playoffs twenty-seven times. They have played more than 310 playoff games, winning 172. As of the end of the 2021–22 season, New York has won more than 1,700 regular season games, the 15th-highest victory total among NHL teams.

The Islanders were founded in 1972 during the  season, and won their first of four consecutive Stanley Cup championships in 1980. The team has since lost the Conference Finals in 1993 to eventual Stanley Cup champions Montreal Canadiens. Since then, the Islanders only qualified for the playoffs once between 1994 and 2001. The Islanders have never won the Presidents' Trophy, although they led the NHL in regular-season points in three seasons before the league began awarding the trophy; they won the Stanley Cup in two out of the three seasons. They last reached the Stanley Cup Finals in 1984, their fifth consecutive appearance and first Finals loss. As of 2022, the Islanders are the last North American team to win four consecutive league championships.

In the lockout-shortened 2013 season, the Islanders returned to the playoffs for the first time since 2007, and just the second time since the 2004–05 NHL Lockout. After defeating the Pittsburgh Penguins in the Patrick Division Final in 1993 the Islanders did not win another playoff series until 2016. A few years later, the team found some sustained playoff success during the COVID-19 pandemic affected seasons of 2019–20 and 2020–21 as they advanced to the third round of the playoffs in consecutive years for the first time since 1984.

Table key

Year by year

All-time records

Notes
The NHL realigned before the 1974–75 season. The Islanders were placed in the Clarence Campbell Conference's Patrick Division.
Before the 1981–82 season, the NHL moved the Patrick Division to the Prince of Wales Conference.
The NHL realigned into Eastern and Western conferences prior to the 1993–94 season. New York was placed in the Eastern Conference's Atlantic Division.
The season was shortened to 48 games because of the 1994–95 NHL lockout.
Beginning with the 1999–2000 season, teams received one point for losing a regular season game in overtime.
The season was canceled because of the 2004–05 NHL lockout.
Before the 2005–06 season, the NHL instituted a penalty shootout for regular season games that remained tied after a five-minute overtime period, which prevented ties.
The season was shortened to 48 games because of the 2012–13 NHL lockout.
The season was suspended on March 12, 2020, because of the COVID-19 pandemic. The top 24 teams in the league qualified for the playoffs.
Due to the COVID-19 pandemic, the 2020–21 NHL season was shortened to 56 games.

References

General

Specific

External links

New York Islanders
seasons